James Davis Warren (born July 20, 1939 in Ferriday, Louisiana, died August 9, 2006) was a collegiate and professional football cornerback who played twelve seasons of professional football, with the American Football League's San Diego Chargers and Miami Dolphins and with the NFL Oakland Raiders.

See also
Other American Football League players

1939 births
2006 deaths
American football defensive backs
Houston Cougars football coaches
San Diego Chargers players
Miami Dolphins players
Oakland Raiders players
American Football League All-Star players
Illinois Fighting Illini football players
People from Ferriday, Louisiana
American Football League players